The Bengal–Jaunpur confrontation was an early 15th-century conflict that stemmed from the Jaunpur Sultanate's opposition to the overthrowing of the Bengal Sultanate's founding dynasty, the Ilyas Shahi, by Raja Ganesha. After diplomatic pressure from the Timurid and Ming empires, Jaunpur's sultan Ibrahim Shah was convinced to abstain from attacking Bengal.

Background

The Jaunpur Sultanate challenged the rule of Raja Ganesha who usurped the throne of Bengal after the overthrowing the Ilyas Shahi dynasty. Raja Ganesha was later removed as a result. But his son later took the throne and converted to Islam.

Conflict
Ibrahim Shah of Jaunpur continued to attack the Bengal Sultanate under Jalaluddin Muhammad Shah.

Foreign mediation
A diplomat in the court of Shahrukh Mirza recorded that the Timurid ruler of Herat intervened during the Bengal-Jaunpur conflict after a request from the Sultan of Bengal. The record speaks of Shahrukh Mirza "directing the ruler of Jaunpur to abstain from attacking the King of Bengal, or to take the consequence upon himself. To which the intimation of the Jaunpur ruler was obedient, and desisted from his attacks upon Bengal". Records from Ming China state that the Yongle Emperor also mediated between Jaunpur and Bengal after the Bengali ambassador in his Peking court complained of the conflict.

Aftermath
The conflict resulted in peace between Bengal and Jaunpur.

See also
Jaunpur-Bhojpur War

References

Conflicts in 1415
Conflicts in 1416
Conflicts in 1417
Conflicts in 1418
Conflicts in 1419
Conflicts in 1420
1415 in Asia
1416 in Asia
1417 in Asia
1418 in Asia
1419 in Asia
1420 in Asia
Military history of the Bengal Sultanate
History of the Timurid Empire
History of the foreign relations of China
Jaunpur Sultanate